Steve Schofield (born 27 February 1958) is a former speedway rider who competed in speedway, Longtrack and Grasstrack Racing. He reached eight World Longtrack world championship Finals as well as seven European Grasstrack Champion finals. He retired through injury having been involved in a bad crash with Jason Crump and Joe Screen at the Bonfire Burn-up.

British Speedway Championship
 1988 –  Coventry (10th) 6pts
 1991 –  Coventry (16th) 2pts
 1994 –  Coventry (3rd) 11pts, after run-off with Joe Screen and Gary Havelock

World Longtrack Championship

One Day Finals
 1987 Semi-final
 1988  Scheeßel (14th) 6pts
 1989  Marianske Lazne (12th) 12pts
 1990  Herxheim (13th) 9pts
 1991  Marianske Lazne (13th) 5pts
 1992  Pfarrkirchen (15th) 2pts
 1993  Mühldorf (5th) 14pts
 1994 Semi-final
 1995  Scheeßel (19th) 1pt
 1996  Herxheim (8th) 8pts

Grand-Prix Years
 1997 5 app (Second) 85pts
 1998 5 app (Third) 85pts
 1999 5 app (Fourth) 76pts

Best Grand-Prix Results

  Abingdon Third 1998
  Cloppenberg First 1997
  Jubeck Third 1999
  Marianske Lazne First 1997
  Marmande Second 1998, Third 1999
  Mühldorf Third 1998 & 1999

European Grasstrack Championship

 1981 Semi-final
 1982  Damme (5th) 15pts
 1983  Nandlastadt (n/s Reserve)
 1985  La Reole (7th) 11pts
 1986  Eenrum (Second) 21pts
 1994  Cloppenburg (Third) 19pts
 1995  Joure (8th) 11pts
 1996  St. Colomb de Lauzen (Second) 21pts

British Grasstrack Championship

500cc Finals
 1982  Second
 1983  Third
 1985  
 1987  
 1988  First
 1989  
 1991  
 1992  Second
 1993  
 1994  Second
 1995  
 1996  Second

350cc Championships
 1980  First
 1981  First
 1982  First
 1983  First
 1984  First
 1985  First
 1986  First

External links
Grasstrack - Steve Schofield

References
 http://www.bournemouthecho.co.uk/news/2332385.back_for_boycey/
 http://www.stamfordmercury.co.uk/news/crump-in-crash-1-494276
 http://www.poolepirates.co/history/hall-of-fame.html

1958 births
Living people
British speedway riders
English motorcycle racers
Poole Pirates riders
Wolverhampton Wolves riders
Individual Speedway Long Track World Championship riders
Expatriate speedway riders in Poland
Weymouth Wildcats riders
Reading Racers riders
Swindon Robins riders
Coventry Bees riders
Cradley Heathens riders
Oxford Cheetahs riders